Als geen ander is the fifth album by Dutch singer Marco Borsato, released in 1995 by Polydor.

Track listing

 Vrij Zijn (3:58)
 Zonder Jou (4:14)
 De Wens (4:20)
 Ik Leef Niet Meer voor Jou (3:36)
 Kom Maar bij Mij (4:22)
 Niemand (3:47)
 Als M'n Hoofd M'n Hart Vertrouwt (2:17)
 Iemand Zoals Jij (3:29)
 Je Hoeft Niet Naar Huis Vannacht (3:27)
 Margherita (4:10)
 Stapel op Jou (4:07)
 Als Jij Maar Naar Me Lacht (4:39)

Charts

Weekly charts

Year-end charts

References

External links
 Track listing 
 Track listing 

1995 albums
Marco Borsato albums
Polydor Records albums